Rogue is a character appearing in American comic books published by Marvel Comics, mostly in association with the X-Men. Created by Chris Claremont and Michael Golden, the character first appeared in Avengers Annual #10 (1981). In her comic book appearances, Rogue is portrayed as a mutant, a fictional subspecies of humans born with an "X-gene" that grants superhuman abilities. She is capable of absorbing the life force, attributes, memories, and superpowers of anyone through physical touch. Rogue is initially depicted as a reluctant supervillain, but she soon joins the X-Men as a superhero and has since endured as one of its most prominent members.

Rogue's early history was only revealed over twenty years after her introduction in her self-titled solo series. The backstory written by Robert Rodi established her real name as Anna Marie, though her surname remains unknown. A runaway from the fictional Caldecott County, Mississippi, Rogue is adopted by Mystique and Destiny and inducted into the Brotherhood of Evil Mutants. She permanently absorbs Ms. Marvel's psyche and Kree powers and, fearing for her sanity, defects from the Brotherhood to join the X-Men to use her powers for good. Although she would later gain full control of her mutant abilities, Rogue considers her powers a curse for many years as they prevent her from getting close to others, including her on-off love interest and eventual husband, Gambit. A white streak that runs through her hair and gloves that enable her to regulate her powers serve as Rogue's visual motif.

Often listed as one of the most notable and powerful female characters in Marvel Comics, Rogue has been adapted in various media incarnations. Anna Paquin portrayed the character in 20th Century Fox's X-Men film series, while Lenore Zann, Meghan Black and Kieren van den Blink have provided her voice in animation.

Publication history
Rogue was first slated to appear in Ms. Marvel #25 (1979) (and artwork for the first half of the story was completed), but the book's abrupt cancellation left her original introduction story unpublished for over a decade until it was printed in Marvel Super Heroes #11 in 1992, where she absorbed her current powers permanently from Ms. Marvel. Rogue's first published appearance was in Avengers Annual #10 (1981). Her second appearance and first cover appearance was Rom #31 (Jun 1982) tied with Uncanny X-Men #158 (Jun 1982), but #158 is also her first X-Book appearance and Rogue joined the X-Men in Uncanny X-Men #171 (1983). Rogue has also had two miniseries and one ongoing title.

Claremont also revealed that Rogue's physical appearance was originally intended to be modelled on Grace Jones; however, artist Michael Golden did not know what Jones looked like. Chris Claremont said in June 2016 that, had he not left Marvel in 1991, Mystique would have been Rogue's real mother. It is a storyline that appeared in a 2009 run of the series "X-Men Forever".

Rogue's real name and early history were not revealed until more than 20 years after her introduction. Until the back story provided by Robert Rodi in the ongoing Rogue series, begun in September 2004, her background was only hinted at. This resulted in Rodi's version of Rogue's origins inadvertently conflicting with earlier information. In X-Men Unlimited #4, Scott Lobdell indicates that Rogue ran away from her father after her mutant powers manifested, but in Uncanny X-Men #182, Rogue reflects that she never knew her father because he had left before she was born, and several issues, including Uncanny X-Men #178 and X-Men #93, indicate that Rogue was taken in by Mystique and Destiny before her mutation became active.

Rogue was a regular character in Uncanny Avengers (2012), beginning with issue #1.

Fictional character biography

Early life
Her parents, Owen and Priscilla, were married early in their relationship and lived in a back-to-nature hippie commune in Caldecott County, Mississippi. Born as Anna Marie, she enjoyed the attentions of her Aunt Carrie, on her mother's side. Anna Marie was raised speaking colloquial English and French, common to the Mississippi bayou area. The commune's failed attempt to use Native American mysticism to reach the "Far Banks" results in Priscilla's disappearance. Carrie takes over Anna's care, and in her grief at the loss of her sister, is a strict and authoritarian guardian. Anna Marie was a rebellious child and, at some point, the exact event or reasons still unclear, she ran away from home as a young teenager.

At some point, Rogue grows close to a boy named Cody Robbins. During their flirtation, Cody impulsively kisses her, at which point her latent mutant power to absorb the life energy and psyche of others with skin-to-skin contact emerges. Rogue is traumatized by the experience, and Cody is left in a permanent coma. Hence, Rogue wears body-concealing clothing that eliminates the possibility of accidental skin contact. She wishes she "did not have to cover up so much around folks" to protect them from her. She thinks her power is a curse.

Not long after, she is approached by Mystique, who seeks her out on the advice of her precognitive partner Destiny. Mystique ultimately takes Rogue in as a daughter. In time, however, Mystique turns Rogue's loneliness, envy, bitterness, and despair into anger, thus recruiting her into the Brotherhood of Mutants.

Brotherhood of Evil Mutants
After Rogue's mutation had emerged, Mystique begined coaxing her into taking part in terrorist activities as a member of the Brotherhood of Mutants. Rogue initially wanted only a normal life, but after she kissed a boy named Cody Robbins, unintentionally rendering him permanently unconscious with her power, she gave up on normality and begins taking part in Mystique's plans.

Rogue and Mystique associated briefly with a mutant named Blindspot, whose power to erase the memories of others by touch somehow counteracts Rogue's mutation enough to allow them to make physical contact safely. Blindspot and Rogue became good friends, but when Mystique decides to sever professional ties with Blindspot, Blindspot erased all memory of her from both Mystique and Rogue.

When Mystique debuts her Brotherhood of Evil Mutants, Destiny advises her to keep Rogue out of the action, advice which proves important when several members of the new Brotherhood are arrested and imprisoned. Mystique concocts a plan to free the other members of the Brotherhood by having Rogue absorb Ms. Marvel's formidable powers. Rogue attacks Ms. Marvel in San Francisco on her front doorstep as she is returning home from grocery shopping. Due to Ms. Marvel's formidable persona, Rogue's struggle to absorb her powers is prolonged, and the transfer of Ms. Marvel's psyche and powers is permanent. Rogue then throws her off the Golden Gate Bridge. She battles the Avengers using her newly acquired powers.

Much later, while at the Pentagon, she literally bumps into Carol Danvers, leading into a fight with Storm, Wolverine and Nightcrawler of the X-Men. Though Rogue proves more than a match for them, the four of them escape the Pentagon. Later, with Mystique and Destiny, Rogue attacks Angel and Dazzler, but is overpowered by Dazzler. Rogue develops a grudge against Dazzler for her controllable mutation and her relationship with Angel of the X-Men. Rogue is defeated by Dazzler a few times before Dazzler is publicly revealed to be a mutant and goes into hiding. Sometime after this, Rogue, Mystique and Destiny encounter the half-human, half-Dire Wraith entity called Hybrid, with whom the three form an alliance against the Spaceknight, Rom. However, when Rogue seizes an opportunity to use her power on him, she experiences both his loneliness and his nobility. This moment has a profound effect on her and serves as a crucial turning point in her life.

X-Men
The more Rogue uses her mutant power, the more her mind becomes filled with fragmentary psychic echoes of the people she absorbs. The permanently absorbed Carol Danvers (Ms. Marvel) is a completely distinct, albeit dormant, personality in her head, and Mastermind subtly exacerbates Rogue's psychological distress as a means of revenge against Mystique. Desperate, Rogue turns to Professor Charles Xavier and the X-Men for help. The Professor is unable to do a psychic scan of her, due to the clashing human and Kree portions of her psyche, but nonetheless decides to not only welcome her into the school, but make her a probationary member of the X-Men. The X-Men threaten to leave the school should Rogue be accepted, even though none of the active members aside from Storm and Nightcrawler had even met Rogue before. However, Xavier is adamant and convinces the X-Men to stay.

The team meets up with Wolverine in Tokyo, where his betrothed, Mariko Yashida, greets Rogue with greater warmth than she had received from her own teammates. This kindness later motivates Rogue to take a fatal laser blast to shield Mariko. Feeling indebted to her for saving his fiancée, Wolverine offers to transfer his healing power to her to save her life. She refuses, arguing that it might kill him, but this only serves to gain his trust, and Wolverine touches her to transfer his power anyway. Soon after, she gains the full trust of the rest of the team by using her power on a severely injured Colossus, willingly leaving herself in the same rigid, melted form as he was to allow Healer to heal his wounds.

Overhearing a frantic message from Carol Danvers' former lover Michael Rossi causes the Danvers persona to become active. Under Danvers' control, Rogue invades a S.H.I.E.L.D. Helicarrier to rescue Rossi. Her natural persona fights to regain control, rapidly switching back and forth between the two personalities. Though Rogue ultimately regains control, the incident leaves her wracked with guilt over what she did to Carol Danvers.

To defeat Adversary, the X-Men's physical and spiritual essences are used as fuel for Forge's energy star, which closes the doorway to Adversary's plane of existence. Roma, a prisoner of Adversary and guardian of the Multiverse, recreates the fallen X-Men from scratch, making her own minor alterations. Now, invisible to cameras and all forms of detection equipment, the X-Men resettle to Australia, defeating the Reavers and claiming their base in the Outback as a new base of operations.

The X-Men use their new status to attack anti-mutant threats around the world. The island nation of Genosha's superpowered agents, the Press Gang, capture Rogue and Wolverine, and Wipeout fully cancels their abilities. Rogue is then sexually molested by her guards. She withdraws into her subconscious, and the Carol Danvers persona takes advantage of her distress by assuming control.

The Danvers personality eventually grows so strong that Carol replaces Rogue's standard X-Men costume with Ms. Marvel's uniform during battle, as well as redecorating Rogue's room to her own tastes without her permission.

Return
Sacrificing herself to stop Master Mold, Rogue is pulled through the Siege Perilous, where she is judged by other-dimensional forces with the promise of a "new life." Rogue is purged of the remaining portions of Carol Danvers's personality, as well as Carol's powers, and teleported back to the X-Men's Outback base. She finds it has been taken over by the Reavers in her absence, and the now-physically separate Danvers persona attacks her. Rogue flees, absorbing the powers of the mutant Gateway to teleport herself to safety. She ends up in the Savage Land, and spends the ensuing days learning how to survive in the inhospitable land. She is eventually attacked again by Danvers, who is now under the mental enslavement of Shadow King. There is not enough life force between the two to sustain both Rogue and Danvers physically as a result of the separation, and Rogue is unwilling to kill Danvers. With Danvers on the verge of draining Rogue's life completely, Magneto intervenes and kills the Ms. Marvel persona.

Rogue and Magneto join forces with Ka-zar and Nick Fury to battle Zaladane, who is trying to conquer the Savage Land. Once Zaladane is defeated and helpless, Magneto kills her, against Rogue and Fury's protests, parting ways with the X-Men's ideals and methods before flying away. Rogue then flies to Muir Island to rejoin the rest of the X-Men, the powers she absorbed from Ms. Marvel now returned.

The X-Men later divide into two teams to make better use of their large number of active members; Rogue is assigned to the Blue Team, under the leadership of Cyclops and alongside new X-Man Gambit. Upon his arrival, Gambit flirts with each of the female members of the team; however, Rogue immediately catches his eye, and he makes no secret of his romantic desire for her. The development of Rogue and Gambit's relationship is slow and rocky, partly as a result of her inability to control her powers and partly as a result of long-term issues with previous relationships on Gambit's part.

As an act of penance, Rogue continues to visit Cody Robbins at a hospice run by a religious order. He is later abducted by assassins sent by Gambit's ex-wife, Bella Donna Boudreaux, as part of a revenge plot against Rogue. Cody is used as a pawn in the ensuing fight between Rogue and Candra and eventually dies. Through a spiritual healer of Bella Donna, Tante Mattie, Rogue is able to make amends with Cody's spirit. He holds no hard feelings against her, knowing what happened was an accident, and urges her to move on.

It is eventually revealed that Mystique had two sons: the now-deceased anti-mutant politician Graydon Creed and Rogue's long-time teammate, Nightcrawler. Rogue and Nightcrawler consider themselves to be siblings, although the revelation has not particularly altered their friendship.

Following the supposed "death" of Cyclops, the X-Men team undergoes major changes, among them Rogue being made the team's new field commander. Her even temper and years of X-Men service make her an ideal leader and she continues to lead the team until Storm returns.

When the Galactic Council transforms Earth into a maximum-security penal colony for hundreds of extraterrestrial criminals, Rogue absorbs the attributes of Z'Cann; a mutant, telepathic Skrull who had joined Cadre K, Xavier's Skrull equivalent to the X-Men. Z'Cann purposely touches Rogue to activate her mutant abilities, as the two evade bounty hunters. Z'Cann uses her telepathy to amplify Rogue's capacity to assimilate memories, causing her powers to mutate. Henceforth, Rogue is able to "recall" previously absorbed powers, but also finds it increasingly difficult to control which powers manifest and when, typically possessing Wolverine's healing factor and claws, Cyclops' optic blasts, and her natural strength.

X-Treme X-Men team
Rogue is part of the X-Treme X-Men team led by Storm. The team's first mission is in search of Destiny's diaries (which prophesy future events). During an invasion of Khan (an alien conqueror from another dimension) of the island nation of Madripoor, Rogue requests that Sage use her power of jump-starting abilities to evolve her to a point where she can control all of the various powers that she has ever absorbed. Sage agrees, and Rogue becomes a one-woman army, able to use the powers of anyone she absorbed in the past all at once.

During Khan's invasion, Rogue is also confronted by Vargas who is said to be "a new species altogether". Vargas foresees himself being killed by Rogue in Destiny's diaries and, despite his belief in the prophecies, attempts to stop this occurrence from happening. Thus, in the midst of the invasion battle, Vargas ambushes Rogue as she is trying to rescue Gambit (see X-Treme X-Men), spearing both Rogue and Gambit with his blade before escaping. Rogue survives due to possessing both Wolverine and the Hulk's powers. Returning to the city shortly after the battle to recover his sword, Vargas is surprised in turn by Rogue dressed in Psylocke's costume (Vargas having killed Psylocke earlier for sport). After a lengthy battle, Rogue fulfills "her destiny" by seemingly finishing Vargas off with his own weapon. Returning to Gambit, Rogue, with the help of Jean Grey, forces him from near death in the astral plane.

Following the repulsion of the invasion, Rogue realizes that Destiny's prophecies are only possibilities and that trying to follow them is more dangerous than ignoring them. She also learns that she inherited a mansion in New Orleans from Destiny, as well as a sizable fortune, and the X-Treme X-Men team retire there to recuperate. Rogue soon leaves the team with Gambit. After emerging powerless from their ordeals, the two want to explore their relationship further.

After life on the road, the couple ends up living in a beach house in Valle Soleada, a town where mutants and humans coexist peacefully. She works as a motorcycle mechanic, while Gambit is often "on the road" (implying he is thieving or on missions with Storm). She subsequently receives a visit from Bishop and Sage and, after a series of events involving an investigation into the murder of a human girl's family, Rogue and Gambit sign up with Bishop and Sage to help Storm's X-Treme X-Men stop Sage's enemy and former boss Elias Bogan. After the battle, Rogue asks Sage to restore Gambit's abilities, which she does. Gambit asks if the same can be done for Rogue, but it is never revisited after Rogue quickly dismisses his comment.

Back to the X-Men
Rogue and Gambit return to the X-Men as part of Marvel's ReLoad. Over time, Rogue's own abilities return, although exactly how and when is never revealed or discussed. However, she no longer possesses the abilities she absorbed from Ms. Marvel. Rogue and Gambit are both put on Havok's team and participated in various missions.

As described in her own miniseries, Rogue then travels down south to save a young mutant girl from her powers. While there, she meets Campbell St. Ange, a young man immune to Rogue's lethal touch. Also while there, Rogue forcibly absorbs knowledge from her Aunt Carrie that explains that Rogue's mother traveled to the Far Banks, a dream-realm, to stop her father from getting there. Rogue encounters the incorporeal spirit of her mother therein and absorbs her memories. After the reunion, her mother's trapped spirit can finally move on. Rogue subsequently goes back to her Aunt Carrie and makes amends with her.

Rogue then returns to the X-Men and confronts the monstrous Golgotha (large space creatures with telepathic abilities that induce insanity in some by bringing out and, to some extent, amplifying people's emotions). As the result of Golgotha influence, Rogue and Gambit get into a fight about the reality of their relationship with Rogue's uncontrollable powers. He claims if they were always able to touch, Rogue would have been "just another one-night stand," that they would have parted much sooner, before leaving. Amplified under the influence of Golgotha, Wolverine's hidden emotions come out, revealing to Rogue he desires her in a romantic/sexual way and, in fact, always had. He and Rogue passionately kiss, until both her power affect him, and Emma Frost telepathically interrupts.

While on a trip to Japan to investigate an incriminating photo of her and Sunfire engaged in criminal activities, Rogue and Sunfire learn that Rogue's former friend and Brotherhood teammate, Blindspot, erased their memories of the event. In this storyline, Rogue accidentally and permanently absorbs Sunfire's fire abilities (who lost his legs to Lady Deathstrike and does not want to live).

Later, back at the X-Mansion, Emma Frost tries to help Rogue and Gambit by providing telepathic relationship counseling, but their relationship continues to be problematic. Rogue then discovers Gambit is being seduced by the student called Foxx. It is later revealed, however, that Mystique, displeased with Rogue's choice of lovers, infiltrated the Xavier Institute by shapeshifting into Foxx and joined Gambit's squad in an attempt to ruin his relationship with Rogue. After Gambit resists her charms, Mystique reverts to her true form and makes an offer to Gambit; she transforms into Rogue and offers Gambit a Rogue with whom he can have a physical relationship. Gambit later denies to having slept with Mystique. Rogue eventually discovers her foster mother's presence in the school and her attempts to seduce Gambit, becoming furious with both parties. Because Gambit fails to tell Rogue of Mystique's presence in the institute, their relationship develops the exact rift Mystique is hoping for, allowing her to set up her daughter with her accomplice, Pulse. After being discovered, Mystique asks the X-Men for permission to stay at the mansion. The X-Men vote, and Mystique is allowed to be a probationary member, a decision with which neither Rogue nor Gambit are happy.

Blood of Apocalypse
In the events that followed M-Day, the mutant Apocalypse is reawakened. Gambit, seeking redemption from Rogue and his fellow X-Men, volunteers to be transformed into Apocalypse's horseman Death. Gambit believes he can control whatever Apocalypse will do to him, in hopes of gaining more power to protect Rogue and the X-Men from the villain. However, having been brainwashed, Gambit tries to kill Rogue (the only part of Gambit's past life that remains). After Apocalypse's defeat, Sunfire (who is granted new legs and transformed into the horseman Famine) and Gambit leaves the X-Men.

Endangered Species: Rogue's X-Men
As Professor Xavier goes into space with Havok and several other X-Men to pursue the villain Vulcan, Cyclops gives Rogue the authority to form her own team, complimenting her inspired improvisation in battle situations. She is hesitant at first, because of Gambit's recent disappearance with Sunfire, but accepts the position, saying that when he comes back, she will still be at the school. She chooses Iceman, Cannonball, Cable, Sabretooth, Lady Mastermind, Karima Shapandar (Omega Sentinel), and Mystique, a line-up with which Cyclops does not agree.

Mystique seemingly tries to repair her relationship with Rogue, but is rebuffed. Rogue's team defeats the group known as the Children of the Vault. Afterward, Rogue declares that her team will leave the X-Mansion.

Rogue is hospitalized after a battle with Pandemic. Cable, desiring Rogue's help in defeating the Hecatomb, forces her awake. Pandemic infects Rogue with a virus, Strain 88, altering her powers by amplifying them into an instantaneous death-touch. In defeating Hecatomb, Rogue absorbs psyches of eight billion entities that were stored inside it.

The team moves to Rogue's hometown of Caldecott for Rogue to recover. As Cyclops and Emma Frost arrive to help Rogue cope with the immensity of the voices in her mind. Marauders arrive, seeking Destiny's diaries. As part of the attack, it is revealed that Mystique is working with the Marauders and for Mister Sinister. Mystique shoots Rogue and takes her back to Mister Sinister's base, who only keeps Rogue alive because she holds all the information of Destiny's diaries within her mind. Gambit, who joined the Marauders and Mister Sinister again, is protective of Rogue, accusing Mystique of being too careless in how she captured her. Standing over Rogue, trying to get her to wake up (after she fell into a trance, overcome by the minds she absorbed), Gambit expresses his apologies for what he did before rejoining Sinister. While in her coma-like state, Rogue has dream-like flashes of memories, seeing her relationship with Gambit, and the millions of minds she absorbed, before briefly waking up and recognizing Gambit. She tells him she had a nightmare, before spouting incoherent words and mysterious coordinates.

Messiah Complex

The X-Men attacks the Marauders' Antarctic base to rescue Rogue and the mysterious mutant baby who is at the center of Messiah Complex. However, the baby eventually takes precedence and the X-Men do not recover (or even see) Rogue.

Mister Sinister, now in possession of the mutant baby, relocates the Marauders to Muir Island. While standing by Rogue's bedside, Mystique is visited by Mister Sinister, who tells her that there will be no cure for Rogue and she will eventually die. Without warning, Mystique ambushes Sinister and shoves his face onto Rogue's. The instant contact seemingly kills Sinister.

Mystique, in keeping with the words of Destiny's diaries, places the baby's face in direct contact with Rogue's, with the understanding that Rogue will awaken from her comatose state. The baby is not affected by Rogue, who awakens shortly after. Realizing what Mystique did at the risk of killing the baby, Rogue says she is tired of people's lives being destroyed by Mystique and grabs Mystique's face barehanded, fully absorbing her powers and consciousness and incapacitating her. However, she immediately regrets her action after realizing that the baby deleted all the consciousnesses she had previously absorbed, along with Strain 88, so that now Mystique is the only one in her head. She says she needs to be alone and tells Gambit not to follow her.

Being cured
Rogue takes some time out from the X-Men and travels around the Australian Outback on a motorcycle. She returns to the X-Men's former headquarters in Maynards Plains, Australia. Once there, she has a conversation with Mystique (a part of Rogue's psyche), telling her that no one else can help her with her powers and that it was down to her to figure out how to control them.

One day, a woman appears in town, claiming to be an anthropologist from Melbourne University. Rogue made it clear she could stay as long as she wants, but to keep out of her way. The anthropologist approached Rogue with questions about some of the items she found in the ghost town. Rogue said she does not know anything about these and to leave her alone. The anthropologist follows Rogue and eventually confesses that she has a different identity. The anthropologist was then targeted by a low flying Shi'ar spaceship and revealed that she was actually Danger in disguise. She informs Rogue she planned to get revenge on Professor Xavier by using her as a conduit. Danger created an amalgamation of several past events in the X-Men's history prominently involving Rogue in the town using her hard light capabilities. As Professor Xavier and Gambit searched for her, Rogue evaded old versions of the X-Men and the Marauders that were part of Danger's creation. She was finally cornered by the Marauders and refused to let Mystique's psyche take control of Rogue's body and save her as the fake Marauder Scalphunter shot at her. Mystique then forcibly took over Rogue's body to save her and fought off the Marauders, then returned control of Rogue's body to her.

Rogue then wandered to the fake Tokyo Tower and tried to find the institute, deducing that the projections around her were changing at 10-minute intervals, altering the environment around her. However, Rogue did not get far as she ended up in Antarctica, witnessing the moment she abandoned Gambit after his trial. She regretted her decisions there, telling Mystique that she really had not moved on. It was at that point that Cody Robbins appeared before Rogue, repeating his greeting from the night her powers manifested. Rogue just stared at him in shock.

Eventually, the Professor, Gambit, and a group of Shi'ar pirates managed to shut down Danger. The pirates, in turn, attacked the Professor, as their intent was to kidnap him and Danger for bounty. In the meantime, Rogue enters the scene and attacks the pirates, but is defeated. However, the Professor reactivates Danger and she defeats the pirates in turn. After this, it was revealed that Rogue's powers never truly developed past their initial "nascent" stage, which was the reason why her powers never functioned properly. The Professor, now aware of this fact, used his telepathy to tear down the mental walls that kept Rogue's powers from developing (the walls were created as a side effect every time she absorbed other people, starting with Cody and even more so with Ms. Marvel) and removed the persistent mental echo of Mystique. Finally, Rogue kissed Gambit, with no ill side effect, revealing that she was finally in control of her absorption power.

Utopia
Rogue, Gambit, and Danger decide to go to San Francisco to regroup with the other X-Men. On their way there they are intercepted by Pixie, who teleports them into the city, which is in a state of chaos due to the anti-mutant and pro-mutant movements. Cyclops admonishes Rogue for her disappearance and sends all three out to locate several missing students and bring them home. During their mission, Rogue faces off against the new Ms. Marvel; finding that she cannot touch her opponent, Rogue resorts to a trick and flees the site.

Later on she joins Gambit, who has been injured by Ares, along with Danger. Ares does not take her seriously and dismisses her both as an opponent and her attempts to calm things down. This results in Rogue grabbing Ares and absorbing his powers. Ares is dismissive of her attempt and claims that she cannot absorb him, a boast that proves wrong as she weakens him enough for Gambit to blast him, leaving him bloody and stunned. Having for the moment absorbed some of Ares' power, she easily dispatches a small group of H.A.M.M.E.R. agents with superhuman strength and proceeds to steal their tank, along with Gambit and Danger, to find the rest of the students.

Rogue finds Trance as her powers are flaring out of control, creating powerful and uncontrollable bio-electric blasts. Rogue tries to help calm Trance and help her gain control when Ms. Marvel appears to fight against Rogue. After taking out Gambit and Danger, Rogue and Ms. Marvel fight; Rogue is losing until Trance regains control and jumps in to help Rogue. Trance learns that her astral form is able to punch Ms. Marvel when they are both intangible. After Gambit stuns Ms. Marvel, they teleport back to base, where Trance receives medical attention.

Nation-X
As Utopia has become a safe haven for mutants, the entire population were on high alert following an attack on the X-Men by Emplate, who feeds on mutant bone marrow for sustenance. The X-Men instruct everyone to stay close to each other and report anything out of the ordinary. Bling goes to check out an old amphitheatre on her own when Emplate captures her to use as a food source.

Unable to enter Emplate's cross-dimensional base, Rogue absorbs Trance's astral projection ability to enter the dimension and save Bling. As she investigates his lighthouse home for clues to Bling's whereabouts, Rogue was attacked by psychoplasmic ghosts. After fighting them off, she rescues Bling from Emplate.

Rogue also protects the students during an attack by a Predator X herd by absorbing the powers of multiple students.

Necrosha
In an attempt to finally achieve godhood, Selene, along with her servant Eli Bard, resurrected many of the X-Men's greatest deceased allies and villains under her control. Among the resurrected is Rogue's foster mother, Destiny, who attempts to contact Rogue but instead contacts Blindfold. However, Proteus had possessed Destiny when she came back. When she makes contact, he leaves her to possess the body of Blindfold, so he can trick her into convincing a team of X-Men to go to Muir Island, where he hopes to kill them. Eventually, Rogue and a team of X-Men manage to defeat Proteus and Rogue tearfully says good-bye to her foster mother as Destiny once more dies.

Post-Siege
Following the Siege of Asgard, Rogue was present at the funeral of Robert Reynolds, the Sentry. She stated that Reynolds was immune to the ill effects of her power and that, in a time in her past when she could touch no one else, she had at least one intimate encounter with him. However, between two episodes of psychic blocks that caused Reynolds to completely forget his life as the Sentry, when he regained those memories for a few days, he contacted Charles Xavier telepathically and did not recognize Rogue when he "saw" her through that telepathic bond.

Second Coming
During the event in which Cable and Hope return to the present timeline, Rogue is able to sense Hope's presence, like Destiny prophesied, although neither she nor Emma Frost can explain it. After a short confrontation with some of Bastion's men, the X-Men and Cable decide for a diversionary tactic. Cable, along with some of the X-Men, stays behind (since it was him they were tracking), while Rogue, Nightcrawler, and Hope leave so that their enemies do not capture Hope. To that end, Rogue absorbs the power sets of Colossus, Wolverine, X-23, the Archangel, and Psylocke.

For a while their tactic works, leaving Cable, along with some of the X-Men, to fend off Bastion's troops. In the meantime, Kurt, along with Rogue and Hope, teleports across the United States towards Utopia. This, however, exerts him to such a degree that he has to rest for a moment; they are soon confronted by Bastion himself. Seeing no alternative, Rogue attacks him, hoping to buy enough time for Kurt and Hope to flee, but Bastion is able to hit Kurt with an energy blast that knocks him out. Channeling Colossus's strength, further enhancing it with Betsy's telekinesis and using the individual claw sets of Logan and X-23 along with their healing factors, Rogue is able to inflict massive damage to Bastion. However, Bastion is able to repair himself and overpower Rogue with an energy discharge which briefly incapacitates her. Unable to do anything, she watches with horror as Bastion fatally impales Kurt with his arm.

Rogue is appointed Hope's protector while on Utopia and allows her to participate in the final battle, where Hope eventually destroys Bastion. Her actions and choices put Hope in danger and ultimately results in Cyclops suspending Rogue from active duty. She, however, remain as Hope's protector and accompanies her to Alaska in search of her real family.

Collision
Rogue, along with Magneto, Alani Ryan, and Anole, accompany Indra to India: Indra because his wealthy parents informed him of his brother being ill; Magneto because he wanted to investigate strange anomalies in electromagnetic fields over Mumbai. They are attacked by giant Servidores who are chasing Luz, a young woman who claims to be a mutant, but later turns out to be from Quitado, an alien city populated by lab-created superhumans. Her "family", the Children of the Vault, tracks her to Indra's house where she, Rogue, and Magneto are defeated and taken prisoner. Rogue is sentenced for execution, as the city's occupants have a particular anger towards her because she had fought against them and killed many of them when they tried to wipe out all inhabitants of Earth, whom they consider as pests. In the meantime, Luz's trick results in the alien city crash landing in Mumbai, which gives Rogue time to knock out her would-have-been executioner.

Post "Age of X"
After the events of the "Age of X" storyline, Rogue decides not to wipe her memories. Gambit admits the extent of his feelings for her, but is also frustrated by her indecisiveness. He tells her that it is better they are apart until she decides to be with him for good and that he would be waiting for her when she is ready. She becomes torn between her feelings for Gambit and Magneto. After Rogue confronts Magneto about his past, she spends a night with him, promising nothing else. Afterwards, Rogue joins Professor X, Frenzy, Legion, Magneto, and Gambit on a mission to capture several of Legion's personalities that escaped after Age of X. The final battle with Legion's personality Styx results in Rogue temporarily absorbing many of Legion's powers, which led her to finding the location of Havok, Polaris, and Marvel Girl; the mutants that were left in space after the X-Men's mission to stop Vulcan.

After the events of "Schism", Rogue chooses to be on Wolverine's team, noting to Cyclops that he has reached a point where his previous willingness to question his decisions has been replaced by an inability to accept when he might be wrong. She returns to Westchester, New York with Wolverine's team to start the Jean Grey School for Higher Learning.

Avengers vs. X-Men
Although Rogue was initially neutral in the war between the Avengers and the X-Men, when the Jean Grey School was surrounded by the She-Hulk, the Moon Knight, and the Falcon to stop other X-Men from joining Cyclops' team, Rogue was forced into action when some students attacked the She-Hulk, declaring her allegiance to Cyclops after Iron Man sent a remote-controlled armor to attack the school. However, Rogue swiftly changed sides again when she witnessed Magik — now empowered by one-fifth of the Phoenix Force — imprison Ms. Marvel in a portion of Limbo that she had brought to Earth. Magik briefly banished Rogue to another world for her defiance, but Rogue was able to return home after helping to resolve a conflict between two alien races, having learned that the leaders of both sides were prolonging the war to keep their populations down to a manageable level. Having returned to Earth, Rogue served as the X-Men's representative when appealing to the Avengers for asylum from the increasingly dictatorial Cyclops. In the aftermath, she helped rescue civilians caught in the crossfire, but finally ended her relationship with Magneto.

Uncanny Avengers
Rogue attends Xavier's funeral alongside Wolverine. Later, after seeing the Scarlet Witch placing flowers on Xavier's grave, Rogue confronts her and orders her to leave, blaming her for his death; the two begin a verbal conflict that results in Rogue punching her in the face, though the Scarlet Witch refuses to fight back. Rogue intends to absorb her powers, but it fails. They are then attacked by five mysterious assailants. During this conflict, the Scarlet Witch is impaled while defending Rogue, and the two are both seemingly defeated.

It is later revealed that the instigator behind the attack on Rogue and the Scarlet Witch was the Red Skull, who has since fused his and Xavier's brains to give him access to his tremendous mental powers. Despite the Skull's attempts to control them, he is eventually defeated by the 'Avengers Unity' team — including Captain America, Thor, Wolverine and Havok — but manages to escape. In the aftermath, Rogue accepts membership of the team, seeing it as the best way to continue Xavier's dream, but notes that she will still not forgive the Scarlet Witch for her actions.

The team makes their debut as the Avengers Unity Squad (which also contains Sunfire, the Wasp, and Wonder Man as the team's latest recruits) during a press conference that debuts them. The press conference is then crashed by a resurrected Grim Reaper, who attacks the Avengers Unity Squad while claiming that he is now unable to die. During the fight, Rogue absorbs some of Wonder Man's powers and seemingly punches the Grim Reaper harder than normal, which apparently kills the Grim Reaper again.

She was later seen fighting alongside Captain America with the Avengers A.I.

Rogue absorbs Wolverine's powers and is told to stop the Scarlet Witch, who is seemingly helping the Apocalypse Twins, but in reality, she plans to use her powers to bring as many of Earth's heroes as she possibly can to defeat the Twins. Wolverine tells her that no one is to be killed if it can be helped, but upon seeing Wanda, Rogue goes into a berserker rage and murders her. Rogue is then killed by the recently re-resurrected Grim Reaper, who had been revived once again by the Apocalypse Twins to be one of their four horsemen of death. Her death was undone when Havok and the surviving members of the Unity Squad were sent from the future by Kang to stop the Twins from destroying Earth, their minds projected back into their past selves so that they could not only warn Rogue what was to come, but then arranged for her to absorb the powers of numerous superheroes to give her the strength to hold the Celestial back. Rogue also finally made peace with Wanda and forgave her. After the crisis was over, Rogue was in the process of being driven mad by all the heroes Rogue had absorbed (all of the Avengers and the X-Men). The Scarlet Witch cast a spell to return those powers to their owners, although Rogue still retained the powers and the very essence that she absorbed from Wonder Man. She has also lost her ability to freely touch others.

X-Men (vol. 4)
In 2013, Marvel revealed a new comic book simply named X-Men. Written by Brian Wood, X-Men features an all-female cast including Storm, Jubilee, Rogue, Kitty Pryde, Rachel Grey, and Psylocke. Rogue was removed from this series' cast after the Battle of the Atom crossover, to avoid contradicting her death in Uncanny Avengers.

AXIS and return to the Uncanny Avengers
After her resurrection, Rogue took part in AXIS with the X-Men, her powers allowing her to sense the aspect of Professor X that remained within the Red Skull. During this time, the AUD was disbanded when various heroes underwent a moral inversion due to a spell cast by Doctor Doom and the Scarlet Witch to stop the telepathic Red Skull. In the aftermath, the Unity Division was reformed, with Rogue as leader of the team.

All-New, All-Different Marvel
Following the Incursions, Rogue remains as the field leader of the Avengers Unity Squad, although she accepts Steve Rogers' official oversight and recommendations for membership, such as Deadpool. She is also depicted as suffering side-effects from the mass terrigenesis, requiring regular injections to stop herself from becoming ill or dying. When various Avengers are brainwashed into civilian lives in the community of Pleasant Hill – a S.H.I.E.L.D. project to 'reprogram' supervillains into regular civilians using fragments of a Cosmic Cube that has since gained sentience – Rogue's new identity of Claire sees through the deception thanks to telepathic training provided by Professor X, allowing her mind to plant various clues that lead her to the rest of the team. The same training helps her to resist telepathic attacks by the Red Skull who is keen to use her powers. Later on, the Red Skull attempts to mount a new attack on the team and Rogue succumbs, but Deadpool is able to resist the telepathic attack long enough to get Magneto's old helmet on Rogue so that she can resist the Skull's telepathy. Rogue subsequently takes the Skull to a new facility where Beast is able to extract the uniquely Xavier elements from the Skull's brain, depriving him of Xavier's telepathy. Rogue and Johnny Storm incinerate the brain, rebelling against the orders of the HYDRA Captain America. Absorbing Deadpool results in the return of Wonder Man (whom she had previously absorbed). She seems to have at least partially gained control of her powers, as seen when she touches Johnny Storm and is held by Wonder Man. She fights against the HYDRA forces in Washington D.C. during the dictatorship of HYDRA Captain America. She resumes her relationship with Johnny Storm and avenges his apparent death by killing Corvus Glaive.

Return to the X-Men
Rogue returns to the Xavier Institute for Mutant Outreach and Education in New York after the incarceration of Kitty Pryde and forms a secondary team with the Iceman, Armor, Ink, Magma, and Magik. Later, Kitty Pryde sends her on an undercover mission with her ex-boyfriend Gambit to the island of Paraiso. Their mission, as an estranged couple requiring relationship therapy, was to investigate the disappearance of mutants. This results not only in them confronting their emotions and relationship challenges, but also finding that their memories and powers (as well as those of the missing mutants) are drained into their clones by a mutant called Lavish. Although they are severely weak, they fight against Lavish and the clones, restoring their memories and powers. The couple decide to reunite and Rogue thanks Kitty for having sent them on the mission. A conversation with Storm and Nightcrawler spurs Gambit into proposing to her at Kitty and Colossus' cancelled wedding and the couple decide to take advantage of all their friends being present. They are married by the rabbi who was present for officiating Kitty's wedding, with Nightcrawler and the Iceman as Rogue's bridal party and with Storm and X-23 as Gambit's best women.

While in space, their honeymoon is interrupted when they receive a message from Kitty Pryde about a secret package that they must find; however, the unknown package involves the Shi'ar Empire and several others are after it as well. They soon discover that the package is actually Xandra, who is the bio-engineered daughter of Xavier and Lilandra who can take any form at will. The newlyweds are soon caught by the Shi'ar but are able to free themselves; with the help of Cerise and the Starjammers, they escape. Having read Rogue's mind, Xandra offers to fix her abilities so she can touch anyone; however, Rogue refuses; when Gambit questions her, she explains that the last time it happened, she never learned to control it herself. The ground is interrupted by the Imperial Guard and by Deathbird and a fight ensues. Realizing they are losing the fight, Xandra uses her abilities to make everyone think she and Rogue were killed; after the Imperial Guard and Deathbird leave, they return, only to have Rogue's ability become uncontrollable, as she can now absorb memories without touching anyone. Xandra explains that her powers have evolved, Rogue will have to learn to control it on her own; Gambit and Rogue return to Earth.

During the holiday season, Gambit and Rogue are pulled into the Mojoverse. They are, at first, unaware of what is going on due to their minds being wiped and living in a Noir setting until Rogue's ability becomes unstable, killing Remy in the process, forcing Mojo to constantly reset their lives to Fantasy, Western, Horror, Romance, Sci-Fi and Comedy. During a reality talk show, Gambit walks off and into a bar, where he meets a mysterious brunette who turns out to be Spiral. She restores his memory and makes Gambit an offer that if he steals something for her, she will help Rogue with her powers and help them escape. Spiral meets Rogue in her mind and explains to her that, until she became self-aware of what her abilities should be doing, she was subconsciously blocking control over her powers.

Powers and abilities

Rogue has been depicted as possessing different abilities in her appearances over the decades.

Mutant powers
Rogue possesses the mutant ability to absorb the psyche and abilities of another human being (or members of some sapient alien races) through skin contact. Rogue can absorb the memories, knowledge, talents, personality and physical abilities (whether superhuman or not) of the person she touches, as well as occasionally duplicating in herself physical characteristics of her victim. The victim loses those abilities and memories for exactly the amount of time that Rogue possesses them. This absorption usually leaves the victim weakened and sometimes renders them unconscious. Their powers may also be temporarily weakened or removed. Rogue's power is constantly active, rendering her incapable of touching others without the absorption process taking place. However, evidence suggests that Rogue's inability to control her powers is psychological in nature. During the times when the Ms. Marvel personality would overtake her psyche, she was able to touch people freely. This fact has since been corroborated by the discovery that Rogue's absorption power never developed beyond the stage of its original manifestation. Xavier later rectified this by telepathically removing the psychological barriers stunting it.

The transfer of abilities is usually temporary, lasting for a period of time relative to how long contact is maintained, but if Rogue holds on to her victim for too long, the transfer may become permanent, leaving the victim nearly dead, as was the case with Ms. Marvel. Ms. Marvel fought the transfer process, which Rogue attested to sometime after the incident occurred. Most often this process happens instantly when Rogue touches someone, but certain extraordinarily powerful beings have proven resistant to Rogue's power, and she may only share part of their memories and power, as was the case when Rogue once attempted to absorb power from the alien Magus. However, in the process of doing so she gained an immunity to the Technarch transmode virus.

After coming into contact with the supervillain Pandemic, Rogue's powers were upgraded for a brief time into an instant death touch. Using her upgraded powers, Rogue absorbed the Hecatomb and the psyches within it, putting her into a coma.

As Rogue is absorbing the total psyche of a person, there is a risk of a personality overwhelming her and taking control of her body. It has also been shown that even though the memories she has absorbed eventually fade when a psyche returns to its body, remnants, or "echoes", of the personalities of victims whose memories she has absorbed remain buried in her subconscious indefinitely, and while there is little to no risk of those personalities overwhelming her like the Ms. Marvel personality could, they can occasionally make their presences known.

Fully developed mutant abilities
Following the conclusion of Messiah Complex, Rogue's slate was wiped clean. The touch of mutant baby Hope mysteriously erased all of the previous memories and abilities Rogue had absorbed, including those of the Hecatomb. It also cured her of the Strain 88 virus. Rogue's touch now simply steals the memories and abilities of individuals with whom she comes in direct skin-to-skin contact. The longer the contact, the longer Rogue retains the absorbed information, powers, and also the abilities of the individuals she absorbs. She can now control her powers, making her touch lethal — or non-lethal — at will.

Following the events of X-Men: Legacy, Rogue appears to be able to activate her powers at will, as opposed to them being constantly active, as demonstrated when she kisses Gambit without incident. Her inability to control her powers stemmed from mental blocks within her mind which formed each time she used her abilities, crippling the development of her powers from their nascent stage. When Professor Xavier removes the blocks, her powers are allowed to develop normally. With this new control, Rogue demonstrates the ability to absorb and collectively utilize all the powers of the New X-Men to defeat a rogue Predator X, with no apparent harm to either them or herself. Her power also affects aliens, such as when she was transferred to a planet in another dimension by Magik, and one of the aliens involuntarily touches her and she gains the ability to communicate in their language, along with their knowledge.

She later uses the version of her powers that renders victims unconscious against the Avengers during her fight with them, making the Falcon and the She-Hulk immediately unconscious and absorbing their powers without any negative feedback on her physical self (besides the She-Hulk's green skin).

The new twist in Rogue's powers consists of prompting her victims of her skin-to-skin contact for a consent on the process. Rogue's victim can either resist the absorption and suffer, like originally with Rogue's powers, or instead submit to the absorption, and so the process instead becomes entirely fluent without consequences. Rogue has used this twist extensively in the Legacy series; just two examples of it are when aiding the victims of a subway collapse absorbing all rescuers' abilities in X-Men Legacy #274, and also when quenching a riot in a prison of mutants absorbing the existence of some mutant-volunteers in X-Men Legacy #275.

During Uncanny Avengers, Rogue used her powers to absorb the energies of numerous superheroes to oppose the Celestial Executioner, stating that she had "been practicing"; she was even able to absorb the ionic energy-based powers of Wonder Man (whom she had been previously unable to absorb). However, apparently due to the scale of the energies she absorbed in the process, Rogue's powers have reverted to their original state, unable to touch anyone without absorbing them automatically, and she retains Wonder Man's psyche and powers.

Anna's powers underwent another change during a battle with the Shi'ar Imperial Guard and a decanting faction of radicals led by Deathbird. The genetically conceived offspring of Charles Xavier and Lilandra Neramani; Xandra had reached into Rogue's conscious mind and used her considerable telepathic abilities to kick start a change in her powers. Initially seemingly no different from before, Rogue's absorption abilities had been vastly augmented from what they were before, still having no control over her abilities, she now has the capacity to drain life energy and supernatural skills from other living beings a good distance away. Eliminating the need to physically touch anyone for her siphoning powers to take effect. After such a harrowing endeavor Spiral showed her how to fix her broken abilities, taking her and Remy to the Mojoworld where Rogue dove into her own subconsciousness and came to terms with herself. Realizing that she had been purposefully limiting her own abilities out of personal fear, now coming to terms with her own shortcomings, Rogue regained control of her life force absorption power and could now willingly initiate the ranged mass absorption effect that Xandra unlocked within her.

After the reboot of X-Men with the release of House of X and Powers of X, Rogue's power absorption is once again proved to be lethal. She could easily kill Apocalypse with mere skin-to-skin touch, resulting in almost instant death with Apocalypse's body withered as she is done absorbing his life-force. The result of her power absorption was that she got Apocalypse's blue skin, although the effect disappeared not long after.

Ms. Marvel powers
As a young woman, Rogue permanently absorbed the superhuman powers and the psyche of Carol Danvers, the original Ms. Marvel. This provided her with superhuman strength, stamina, durability, reflexes, speed and a seventh sense. She was able to repel bullets and fly at sub-sonic speeds, much like Ms. Marvel could. In addition, she possessed an amalgamated mutant human/Kree physiology that rendered her resistant to most toxins and poisons, with the added effect of making her virtually invulnerable.

Rogue also gained a precognitive "seventh sense" that enables her to unconsciously predict an enemy's move during battle. She used this ability to predict where Nightcrawler would teleport and from which direction Magus of the Technarchy would attack. This ability was not always reliable, however, and would randomly and sporadically activate.

When she possessed Carol Danvers' psyche, her "dual" psyche made her highly resistant to telepathic probes, even those of Charles Xavier, which was said to have been a byproduct of two minds existing in one body and/or Carol Danvers' human/Kree physiology. The Ms. Marvel psyche was eventually separated from Rogue's in a subsequent issue, and it was destroyed by Magneto.

Powerless
For a time Rogue lost all of her powers, including her original mutant ones, after she was critically injured in a fight with the mysterious warrior Vargas. During this period, she displayed exceptional fighting skills and agility, though it was said these were not superhuman in nature.

She also still possessed a "fluid genome" that enabled Sage to use her as a conduit through which to channel the mutant powers of the X-Treme X-Men team in a fight against Bogan.

Sunfire powers
In the short-lived volume 3 of her self-titled series (2004–2005), Rogue absorbed a large portion of the mutant Sunfire's solar-absorption based powers. In addition to her own natural mutant abilities, Rogue could then project intense heat and flame, envelop her body in a fiery aura, fly by focusing her power downwards in a tight stream to propel her like a rocket, focus her power inward to increase her strength (though not at her Ms. Marvel levels), exercise immunity to heat and radiation, and see the infrared spectrum. Rogue was eventually purged of these abilities when she came into contact with Hope Summers.

Wonder Man powers
Rogue currently possesses Wonder Man's essence, including his powers and psyche. Her organic tissues have been permeated with ionic energy, granting her an array of superhuman abilities. She possesses superhuman strength sufficient enough to lift well over 100 tons, as well as some degree of superhuman speed, agility and reflexes. In addition, Rogue is virtually invulnerable to damage and is capable of flying at high speeds. Rogue's eyes glow in the dark and her vision extends somewhat into the infrared spectrum, allowing her to see in the dark. Her new ionic physiology also grants her a form of immortality, protecting her from age and disease.

Natural skills
Rogue has shown a fair knowledge of unarmed combat when in a position where she has to fight in situations where she cannot simply use her powers to knock out her foe. She has also received a degree of training from Professor X to protect herself against even subtle telepathic attacks, this training allowing her to escape Kobik's reprogramming of various Avengers and villains to reassemble her teammates against this new threat when even experienced telepaths like Cable were trapped in the illusion.

Real name
In the Going Rogue arc of her 2004 ongoing series, Rogue's real name is finally established as Anna Marie. Rogue reaches her childhood home of Caldecott County, where her surviving maternal aunt and the shamanistic incarnation of her mother repeatedly refer to her as "Anna Marie"; Gambit also refers to her as "Anna" instead of "Rogue". Rogue learns her true given name at birth was "Anna Marie" from the absorbed memories of her aunt, who helped raise Rogue with Rogue's father after Rogue's mother vanished from their home. Rogue acknowledges the name uttering: "(Anna Marie) Th-that's my name...," right after a shamanistic doppelgänger of Rogue mentions it, and later she says: "I-It's me. Anna," once after finding Gambit in the dream world.

Throughout the X-Men Legacy series, Rogue is repeatedly called "Anna" by Mystique, in childhood memories of Caldecott County (X-Men #200, August 2007), after healing in Muir Island (X-Men #207, March 2008), and in moments of solitude at the Australian desert (X-Men #215, 220–222, 224). Uncanny X-Men #517 and 526 use the complete name of Anna Marie Rogue when describing her fighting against Predator 006 at Utopia and before a mission aboard the X-Jet to Alaska; X-Force #26 also does so, and "Secrets of the House of M" (2005) states for Rogue's file the first name of "Anna Marie" and the last name of Darkholme, although the latter is referring to Mystique's last name, since Mystique is her foster mother since her childhood in Caldecott County. In X-Men: Legacy #238, Rogue is identified as "Anna Marie, aka Rogue," overflying Mumbai aboard an airliner together with Magneto, and then Rogue also introduces herself as "Anna Marie" to Indra's parents, whereas in X-Men: Legacy #239 Rogue is identified as "Anna Marie" by a squadron of Sentinels. In Uncanny Avengers #4, after fighting the Red Skull's clone, Rogue is interrupted in her convalescence, again being called "Anna Marie" by Wanda Maximoff. Later, her former teammate Johnny Storm calls her "Anna Marie" when joining her in bed. In X-Men #2 (2013), Rogue is referred to as "Anna Marie", while being restrained in the basement of the X-Mansion by the invading Arkea entity.

In the 20th Century Fox films X-Men, X2: X-Men United, X-Men: The Last Stand, and X-Men: Days Of Future Past, Rogue's real first name is Marie. According to the official novelization of X-Men, her surname in the film series is "D'Ancanto". In the comics, her chosen name (according to X-Treme X-Men #31) is Anna Raven when her powers are inactive (Raven Darkholme is Mystique's name). In X-Men #24, she tries to reveal it to Gambit on a date, but he stops her.

Her profile in the X-Men 2005 issue of the Official Handbook of the Marvel Universe lists her real name as Anna Marie. Chris Claremont has also used the name "Anna-Marie Raven" in reference to Rogue in non-diegetic establishing text in X-Men Forever, although it is not clear whether or not the team knows her name, as they do uniformly refer to her as "Rogue."

Cultural impact and legacy

Critical reception 
Martyn Warren of Screen Rant referred to Rogue as "one of the greatest X-Men of all," writing, "Rogue made her first appearance in Avengers Annual #10 in 1981 and since her debut, she has become one of the most recognizable super-powered mutant members of the X-Men. Her power to absorb the lifeforce of humans and the powers of mutants with physical contact does make her a potentially dangerous ally. But with such a caring heart and an upbeat personality, she always takes a challenge head-on, no matter how difficult it is. With multiple appearances in comics, television shows, and films, she has gained a huge fan base who treasure the many quotes she has delivered over the past 40 years." Michael Austin of CBR.com called Rogue "one of X-Men's most popular women," saying, "One of the most popular superhero teams of all time, the X-Men's roster is made up of many different iconic characters. Marvel has also used those characters to craft some of the best stories in comic book history. One of the most important of these characters is Rogue. Although initially a villain, Rogue quickly rose to become one of the most popular X-Men. She has come a long way since her villainous beginnings and has been a part in some of the best X-Men teams and stories ever." Darren Franich of Entertainment Weekly described Rogue as one of the characters "who left a significant footprint on X-history," asserting, "She's been a young villain-ingenue and a flowing-hair babe with a Gambit fixation, but there's always something fundamentally sad and fascinating about Rogue. Her superpower is tragic at the level of great science fiction: If she touches anyone, she absorbs their powers, their memories, and their whole life. (Touch them too long and they die.) Rogue is how you teach kids about melancholy." Jacob Threadgill of The Clarion-Ledger stated, "Hailing from fictional Caldecott County, Mississippi, the character Rogue has gone from misunderstood villain to one of the most beloved female characters in comic book history as a member of the X-Men. In popular culture, Rogue’s backstory of isolation as a confused teen who has the ability to absorb fellow mutants' powers, memory and personality has struck a chord with fans worldwide."

George Marston of Newsarama referred to Rogue as one of the "best X-Men members of all time," asserting, "Rogue started out as a villain, but for the Avengers rather than the X-Men. Since reforming to heroism, Rogue has become one of the most long running and powerful members of the X-Men." Matthew Aguilar of ComicBook.com asserted, "Over the years the X-Man known as Rogue has seen many changes to her powers, costume, and even personality. Those are interesting in their own right, but today the focus is squarely on the many looks she's adopted over the years, each of which has its own cadre of fans. The character left quite the impression on the Avengers in her first appearance (1981's Avengers Annual #10), and ever since she's been a stalwart of the X-Men universe. Granted she started out on the wrong side of things, but hey, it doesn't matter where you start, only where you finish. Fortune cookie psychology aside, Rogue appeals to fans because of her unyielding charisma, her southern charm, and an intriguing powerset that comes with its own struggles. She can fly, lift a tank, and punch through a wall, but being cut off from physical contact with others has always been a fly in the ointment, and that struggle is an essential part of the character." Matthew Perpetua of BuzzFeed stated, "She's easily one of the best characters on a purely thematic level. She's a walking, talking metaphor for sexual anxiety, particularly during the AIDS epidemic of the '80s – she can't touch ANYONE without absorbing part of them and potentially killing them. The character has suffered a bit in recent years thanks to writers insisting on giving her control over her powers and reversing a lot of what makes her special, but Rick Remender has done a good job of reconnecting Rogue with her impulsive, surly roots over in Uncanny Avengers."  Sara Century of Syfy said, "Gambit and Rogue are a couple that becomes infinitely more intriguing due to their ability to find stability with one another. The easier and more lighthearted the dynamic, the sexier it becomes. In more recent days, Rogue and Gambit have gone from being a hopelessly melodramatic and toxic pairing to being the X-Men’s most endearing couple. They worked through their issues together in therapy and reunited in a surprisingly healthy way. When Kitty Pryde left Colossus at the altar, Gambit took the opportunity to propose to Rogue, and they turned attention from an exhausted relationship to a promising new future together. Without question, Gambit and Rogue are at their very best now, and it’s refreshing to read a couple who are just flat-out good for one another in a mythos mired so often in frustration and personal tragedy."

Accolades 
 In 2006, IGN ranked Rogue 4th in their "Top Ten X-Babes" list and 5th in their "Top 25 X-Men" list.
 In 2008, CBR.com ranked Rogue 1st in their "Top 50 X-Men of All Time" list.
 In 2011, Comics Buyer's Guide ranked Rogue 10th in their "100 Sexiest Women in Comics" list.
 In 2011, IGN ranked Rogue 5th in their "Top 25 X-Men" list.
 In 2014, BuzzFeed ranked Rogue 5th in their "95 X-Men Members Ranked From Worst To Best" list.
 In 2015, Bustle ranked Rogue 11th in their "14 Female Superheroes Who Deserve Stardom" list.
 In 2015, Entertainment Weekly ranked Rogue 4th in their "Let's rank every X-Man ever" list.
 In 2017, Comicbook.com ranked Rogue 8th in their "10 Best X-Men" list. 
 In 2018, CBR.com ranked Rogue 10th in their "Age Of Apocalypse: The 30 Strongest Characters In Marvel's Coolest Alternate World" list and 6th in their "20 Most Powerful Mutants From The '80s" list.
 In 2018, GameSpot ranked Rogue 28th in their "50 Most Important Superheroes" list.
 In 2019, Mashable ranked Rogue 2nd in their "8 Badass Women of Marvel We Cannot Stop Fangirling Over" list.
 In 2019, Comicbook.com ranked Rogue 37th in their "50 Most Important Superheroes Ever" list.
 In 2020, Scary Mommy included Rogue in their "195+ Marvel Female Characters Are Truly Heroic" list.
 In 2021, CBR.com ranked Rogue 4th in their "10 Strongest Characters From X-Men Comics" list and 6th in their "20 Strongest Female Superheroes" list.
 In 2021, Women in the World ranked Rogue 15th in their "Best Female Marvel Characters" list.
 In 2021, Screen Rant ranked Rogue 1st in their "Marvel Comics: The 10 Greatest Redemptions" list, 4th in their "The 10 Strongest X-Men" list, and ranked Rogue and Gambit 9th in their "10 Best Relationships in The X-Men Comics" list.
 In 2022, CBR.com ranked Rogue 2nd in their "Marvel: 10 Best Reformed Villains" list,  5th in their "10 X-Men Characters Fans Want In the MCU" list, and 7th in their "The Avengers' Greatest Leaders" list.
 In 2022, Sportskeeda ranked Rogue 6th in their "10 best X-Men characters who also joined the Avengers" list.
 In 2022, Newsarama ranked Rogue 10th in their "Best X-Men members of all time" list.
 In 2022, Screen Rant ranked Rogue 2nd in their "Top 10 X-Men, Ranked by Fighting Skills" list, 5th in their "10 Best X-Men Characters Created By Chris Claremont" list, 6th in their "10 Best Marvel Comics Characters That Went From Villain To Friend" list, and included her in their "10 Most Powerful X-Men" list.
 In 2022, MovieWeb ranked Rogue 6th in their "X-Men Characters That Need Redemption In The MCU" list.
 In 2022, Digital Trends ranked Rogue 9th in their "Marvel’s most powerful mutants" list.
 In 2023, CBR.com ranked Rogue 6th in their "10 Most Fashionable Marvel Heroes" list.

Literary reception

Volumes

Rogue - 2004 
According to Diamond Comic Distributors, Rogue #1 was the 26th best selling comic book in July 2004.

Rogue & Gambit - 2018 
According to Diamond Comic Distributors, Rogue & Gambit #1 was the 38th best selling comic book in January 2018. Rogue & Gambit #1 was the 478th best selling comic book in 2018.

CBR Staff of CBR.com called Rogue & Gambit #1 a "promising first issue," saying, "I know Rogue and Gambit are one of the canonical Big Romances of superhero comics, but I couldn’t say for sure that I’ve ever actually read a comic with the two of them together as a couple. Not that this presents any real barrier to reading Rogue & Gambit #1. The issue does a great job of positioning them and their relationship in simple, understandable terms. [...] Given it’s a story about a couple reconnecting, or failing to, a little awkwardness between the two leads is actually quite appropriate. Whether the art is able to turn up the heat -- and indeed whether the developing relationship of Rogue and Gambit will require it to -- remains to be seen, but this first issue certainly has me crossing my fingers." Joshua Davison of Bleeding Cool stated, "Rogue and Gambit #1 is an entertaining comic, and I do get what fellow reviewer Joe Glass sees in it. However, it tries to have its cake and eat it too. It's not action-heavy enough to feel like a good superhero tale, but it's not calm enough to shoot for slice-of-life. While comics like Hawkeye, Astonishing Ant-Man, and Spider Woman have managed to make that balance work in the past, this one doesn't. If you really do like these two X-Men as a couple, then you should definitely check it out. It will likely give you exactly what you want. However, if you're looking to be sold on them as a couple, then, like myself, you probably won't get much out of it."

Mr. & Mrs. X - 2018 
According to Diamond Comic Distributors, Mr. & Mrs. X #1 was the 15th best selling comic book in July 2018.  Mr. & Mrs. X #1 was the 141st best selling comic book in 2018.

Jamie Lovett of ComicBook.com asserted, "In a very real way, Thompson, Bazaldua, and D'Armata have with Mr. and Mrs. X #1 delivered the comic book that many fans have been waiting their entire comics-reading lives to read. People have been following Rogue and Gambit's ups and downs for decades waiting for a series that does the couple justice by celebrating their love rather than leaning on their heartbreak. With Thompson's delightful dialogue and characterizations, Bazaldua's balance of the intimate and the exciting, and D'Armata's tone-setting, Mr. and Mrs. X seems set to deliver equal parts overdue emotional payoff and endearing adventure." Joshua Davison of Bleeding Cool said, "Gambit and Rogue are frigging adorable in this and seeing the excited assistance from the likes of Storm, Jubilee, Bishop, and a mystery guest I won't spoil makes this comic click so well. [...] Mr. and Mrs. X (not crazy about that name, though) #1 is a delightfully upbeat comic that brings an endearing and dare-I-say heartwarming wedding issue (that Batman #50 cheated me on and dammit I'm still so mad) between two classic and charming X-Men characters. The dialogue is great, the story is fun, and the artwork is great. This one earns a recommendation. Give it a read."

Other versions

Age of Apocalypse
In the Age of Apocalypse reality, Rogue is brought to Magneto and his X-Men for education in her powers by Mystique. Soon after this, Rogue would battle against Apocalypse's son Nemesis (who later became Holocaust) alongside the Scarlet Witch, and would witness the death of the latter. During the next few years, Rogue would express an attraction to both Gambit and the leader of the X-Men, Magneto. She would ultimately become romantically involved with Magneto after he worked out a way for them to touch by surrounding his body in a tight electromagnetic 'sheath' that prevented her from actually making contact with his skin, while still feeling as though she was. The two would later conceive a son named Charles, after Charles Xavier, who was slain by Legion whose target had actually been Magneto himself. The Age of Apocalypse universe was later revealed to have been preserved due to the actions of Jean Grey. Rogue and Magneto, along with that reality's X-Men continue their lives.. This reality's version of Rogue had her uncontrollable absorption abilities and permanently possessed around half of Polaris' magnetic abilities. Unlike her husband Magneto and Polaris herself, Rogue appeared to prefer to use these abilities to fly and augment her physical strength and durability to superhuman levels.

Age of X
Rogue appears in the Age of X continuity going by the name Legacy (also known as the Reaper). She is not allowed to be in the forefront of battles, but has the sole purpose of using her powers to absorb the memories and powers of dying mutants, as well as those of Captain America after he sacrificed himself to save Fortress X from the Hulk. She becomes curious when Kitty Pryde is caught getting back into the grounds and finds a camera - which, suspiciously, has hundreds of blank photos. This results in her questioning everything and figures that she can get answers only from Kitty, who is imprisoned. She goes against orders and infiltrates the prison, coming across Blindfold and, later, Professor Xavier. After absorbing the Professor's powers, she realizes that everything is not what it seems to be. However, she cannot control his powers and unleashes a psychic attack on all mutants in the Fortress. Considered as a traitor, she is hunted by Moonstar and her team. She flees to Logan, who dresses her wounds. She confesses that she is puzzled by how she seems to know Charles Xavier but cannot figure out how; at the same time, his memories paint a different picture of everything. Moonstar tracks her and she is shot down when fleeing. Gambit rescues her, but Magneto seemingly buries them under a pile of rubble for their "traitorous" actions. This was a ruse, as Magneto himself was suspicious and was the individual who dispatched Kitty to take the photos. Following information from Magneto, Rogue and Gambit break into a secret chamber and find that the culprit behind the alternative reality is Moira, an alternate persona of Legion.

Amalgam Comics
In the Amalgam Comics limited run, Rogue is combined with the DC Comics character Gypsy to form the new character Runaway.

Exiles
In the New Exiles series, Rogue is from Earth-1009 and comes from a life of "wealth, privilege and sophistication." Apparently a master thief, she has a different personality from her Earth-616 version. She can absorb others' abilities and memories through her hands, but unlike the original Rogue, the rest of her body can be touched without ill effects. Moreover, she can keep the borrowed powers and use them at will. In addition, she possesses super strength, durability, the ability to fly, the ability to disintegrate matter with a touch, and the ability to heal others' wounds. Her bodysuit hides mysterious tattoos.

House of M
The House of M Rogue is an agent of S.H.I.E.L.D. and part of the Red Guard, working with Wolverine, Mystique, the Toad, Nightcrawler, and Jessica Drew. She plays an important role in the resistance to Magneto. After being contacted by the resistance movement, Rogue briefly touches Layla Miller and appears overwhelmed, as the acquired power emanated from her and awakened others in the vicinity to the reality of the House. In the final battle, Rogue, finally able to unleash her powers to their full extent, tackles both Namor and Princess Ororo and absorbs their abilities, causing her to overflow with power. She even absorbed the powers of Genis-Vell. Due to the nature of Genis' genetics and powers, half of Rogue's body transforms into a seemingly window to a cosmic landscape of black void dotted with stars. During the final battle, Quicksilver finds the cosmically powered Rogue waiting up top. Pietro slams into Rogue and is sent flying back.

Marvel 1602
A version of Rogue appears in the Marvel 1602 spin-off "Angela: Witchunter".

Marvel Noir
Rogue appears in X-Men Noir as Anne-Marie Rankin, one of Professor Xavier's students. She has a talent for imitating the personality traits and mannerisms of any person, allowing her to fit into any situation. Professor Xavier considered her a missing link or patient zero in his theories about sociopathy as the next stage of human behavioral evolution.

Marvel Zombies
During the Ultimate Fantastic Four crossover where the Ultimate Universe's Fantastic Four visit the Marvel Zombies Universe, Rogue is seen as a zombified hero in one of the panels before the infection spread out.

Mutant X
In this darker reality, Rogue operates with a smaller X-Team consisting of Magneto, Nightcrawler, Polaris, Quicksilver, Cerebo, and a metallic-looking Mystique. Rogue herself maintains the steel and ridged skin of Colossus, having unintentionally absorbed his power when her glove disintegrated while she was trying to carry him to safety, and wears a version of Ms. Marvel's lightning bolt uniform.

Prelude to Deadpool Corps
In issue #2, Deadpool visits a world where Rogue and Jean Grey are orphaned kids at an orphanage run by Emma Frost. At a dance where Professor X and Emma's orphans can have fun, Rogue can be seen calling Kidpool (a kid version of Deadpool who attends the Professor X Orphanage for Troubled Kids) a dork.

Professor W’s X-Men
Rogue has defected from the X-Men in this series to join Cyclops' new Brotherhood of Evil Mutants. This drastic change in alliance can be partially attributed to the fact Rogue has fully absorbed the powers and life force of the Super-Skrull, gaining his Skrull alien traits, the powers of all the members of the Fantastic Four, as well as Kl'rt's personality and memories. As a result of this absorption, Rogue's own personality has become warped, even regarded by her own teammates as acting villainous.

Ultimate Marvel
In the Ultimate Marvel continuity, Rogue is first introduced in the story arc Return to Weapon X as a prisoner of Weapon X and she worked with the Juggernaut and Nightcrawler. In this version, her name appears to be Marian Carlyle. Her powers are exploited to steal sensitive information on the location and layout of the Xavier Institute for Gifted Children. Using this information, agents of Weapon X storm the school and capture the X-Men. Rogue is released along with the X-Men, the Juggernaut, and Nightcrawler, when a combination of the Brotherhood of Mutant Supremacy and S.H.I.E.L.D rescues them and destroys Weapon X's facility. Though offered a place on the X-Men, she joins the Brotherhood. She later joins the X-Men in the Return of the King arc.

In the Cry Wolf story arc, the X-Men are attacked by Gambit who kidnaps Rogue and takes her to his employers, Andreas and Andrea von Strucker. They hope to use her powers for "corporate espionage". In exchange for her help, they promise her they will help her control her powers through a power-dampening material they had developed. She turns them down, feeling that her powers are her penance. Rebuked, they attack Rogue and Gambit. She touches both of them and uses their powers to fend off their guards. The X-Men arrive to take her back, but she turns them down and leaves with Gambit.

Rogue does not appear again until Ultimate X-Men Annual #1, in which she and Gambit fight the Juggernaut. Gambit sacrifices himself to save Rogue and she kisses him as he dies at his request. With this kiss, she takes his powers that seemingly override her own, ridding her of her 'death touch' through several of the books (this also affects Rogue's appearance, as she acquires black eyes with red irises). In the subsequent story arc Date Night, Rogue decides to rekindle her relationship with the Iceman after she loses her virginity to him (something possible due to her being able to touch him now).

During Ultimate X-Men Annual #2, Rogue speaks to Professor Xavier about her concerns regarding Gambit's powers still remaining. Xavier theorizes this is only a temporary change and her powers will return within time. Towards the end of the Annual, Rogue touches a delusional Nightcrawler and her old powers re-emerge, causing her to start teleporting randomly, and she loses Gambit's power, sending her back into the shell of hiding her skin, much to her and the Iceman's dismay.

During Ultimate X-Men #77, she loses her arm during a fight with Cable. However, after absorbing some of Wolverine's healing power, her arm appears to grow back.

In Ultimate X-Men #80, Cyclops disbands the X-Men following Xavier's death. Rogue stays with the Iceman at the Xavier Institute as a student. Xavier later returns and reveals himself to be alive. Rogue once again becomes an X-Man. At the end of Ultimate X-Men, a Banshee-enhanced Rogue is seen to be a member of Colossus' team. Her appearance heavily altered, it seems her abilities have been enhanced such that she can call on absorbed abilities, as she has Colossus' armored flesh and the Angel's feathered wings extending from her arms. While telling Cyclops the benefits of Banshee she kisses him; when asked why, she replies "'Cause I can."

In Ultimate X-Men #95, she reveals that when her father got drunk he would molest her. Once when he tried to touch her, she took his life. She also appears to have found out who Vindicator was, but before she could elaborate, Vindicator took her out.

Addicted to Banshee, Colossus' X-Men began to acquire more Banshee from the Acolytes. When they were discovered by the others, a battle raged. She absorbed the Iceman's power and kissed him to show what Banshee could allow her, but the kiss was broken off by Firestar. Hostilities ceased when Northstar turns up — alive, but crippled.

After the Ultimatum Wave hits Manhattan, Jean refuses to allow Rogue to join her, as she cannot be trusted. Rogue then attacks Department H, absorbing Sasquatch's power and attacked Jubilee. It is then revealed that Vindicator is, in fact, John Wraith, whom she blames for ruining her life. She threatens him for help in killing Magneto. They travel to Montreal, where Rogue poses as a stripper to get close to Sabretooth and the Juggernaut. The Purifiers soon attack the X-Mansion and the Juggernaut dies fighting alongside Rogue. Rogue absorbs his powers just before he dies and now permanently possesses them. She then helps the X-Men in their effort to defeat Magneto and his Brotherhood. They do so, but suffer many casualties. Rogue is one of the few X-Men to survive to battle alongside Jean Grey, the Iceman, Shadowcat, Storm, and Colossus. She is last seen helping Jean Grey and the Iceman tear down the Xavier Institute and everything on the estate. They bury the remains of the deceased X-Men in its place.

What If?
In "What If the X-Men Stayed in Asgard", Rogue is one of the X-Men and New Mutants to remain in Asgard when she finds that her powers does not affect the Asgardians. She finally ends up falling in love with and marrying Fandral of the Warriors Three, whose place is subsequently taken by Nightcrawler.

In "What If Rogue possessed the power of Thor?", Rogue accidentally permanently absorbed Thor when she and Mystique attempted to break the Brotherhood out of prison, resulting in her killing most of the Avengers and the Brotherhood when she was unable to cope with Thor's power. Although Loki attempted to manipulate her into waging war on Asgard after she was able to lift Thor's hammer, the sight of Odin's genuine sense of loss allowed Thor's remnants to manifest in her subconscious, affirming that he was an ideal as well as a person, allowing Rogue to inherit his power and position as she became the new Thor.

In "What If Mystique had raised Nightcrawler?", Rogue's attempt to free Nightcrawler from the attic where Mystique had kept him to 'protect' him resulted in him being mortally injured by the Brotherhood when they mistook him for an X-Man; Rogue's attempt to use his power to escape resulted in her permanently absorbing Nightcrawler's powers and appearance due to the prolonged contact she maintained.

In What If? (vol. 2) #114, the heroes taken to the Beyonder's Battleworld never returned to Earth. In this reality, Rogue is called Carol, implying that the absorbed Ms. Marvel persona is the dominant consciousness. Because Carol is in control, Rogue's absorption powers are under control and she is married to Captain America. They also have a daughter together named Sarah, who inherited some of her mother's abilities and is known as the Crusader. This version of Rogue appears to have her original mutant powers, as well as Ms. Marvel's powers. It was also shown that she wears Ms. Marvel's costume into battle.

In the What If? story "Bullet Points", in which a single bullet changed the history of Bruce Banner, Peter Parker, Anthony Stark, and Steven Rogers, Rogue is seen alongside the X-Men of this reality, and appears in her iconic costume. She presumably has the same history as her mainstream counterpart and possesses both her own mutant abilities and the powers of Ms. Marvel. She later assists her teammates and many other heroes and villains against Galactus and watches as the Silver Surfer dies to prevent Earth from being devoured.

In the "What If Xavier's Secret Second Team had Survived Krakoa?" storyline, Rogue is seen as a member of Vulcan's X-Men. She seems to possess both her own mutant abilities as well as the powers of Ms. Marvel, as she is seen flying and wearing gloves. Her history is presumably the same as her mainstream counterpart, though she wears a blue uniform and yellow gloves rather than her iconic costume.

X-Men: The End
In an alternative future featured in the series X-Men: The End, Rogue and Gambit are married and have two children named Olivier and Rebecca "Becca" LeBeau. Rogue has also gained complete control over her abilities in this timeline. This Rogue defeats Shaitan and rescues her children from the Neverland Camp, but was ultimately killed by Mister Sinister when he was disguised as Gambit.

X-Men Forever
In this reality, Rogue has absorbed Nightcrawler's abilities when he gave her mouth-to-mouth, granting her Nightcrawler's skin and tail as well as exceptional athletic abilities, although this has also left Nightcrawler with Rogue's powers and looking like a normal human. Claremont has kept the plot thread from Fall of the Mutants concerning the X-Men's encounter with Roma intact, and so Rogue is still rendered undetectable to cameras, appearing only as a blur on screen or film. While exploring her new powers, Rogue runs into Spider-Man and spends the night fighting crime alongside him; she suggests that they kiss to see if her original abilities have been affected by her transformation, but they are interrupted by a Sentinel attack before they can actually make contact.

Uncanny Avengers
In the Age of Ultron storyline, Rogue and Havok are a married couple, leading the Morlocks. Captain America approaches them in the tunnels with the intent of escorting Caliban for a trial. However, the meeting is interrupted by the Apocalypse Twins, who are on a mission to kill Captain America. In the end, they kill Havok (when he defends Captain America) and Rogue (when she retaliates for Havok's death).

In other media

Collected editions

References

External links

 
 Rogue Shrine. Comprehensive appearance list and chronology, etc.
 Rogue at the Marvel Database Project (wiki)
 New Generation X
 UncannyXmen.net Spotlight on Rogue at UncannyXMen.net

Avengers (comics) characters
Characters created by Chris Claremont
Characters created by Michael Golden
Comics characters introduced in 1981
Female characters in animated series
Female characters in film
Female characters in television
Fictional characters from Mississippi
Fictional characters with absorption or parasitic abilities
Fictional characters with precognition
Fictional mechanics
Fictional waiting staff
Marvel Comics American superheroes
Marvel Comics characters who can move at superhuman speeds
Marvel Comics characters with superhuman strength
Marvel Comics female superheroes
Marvel Comics female supervillains
Marvel Comics film characters
Marvel Comics martial artists
Marvel Comics mutants
Superheroes who are adopted
X-Men members